TNCC may refer to:

 Tainan City Council, the city council of Tainan, Taiwan
 Tamil Nadu Congress Committee, India
 The Natural Confectionery Company, owned by Cadbury Schweppes
 Thomas Nelson Community College, US
 Curaçao International Airport (ICAO code)
 Trauma Nursing Core Course, in the list of emergency medicine courses